714 Ulula is a main belt asteroid. It is orbiting the Sun near the 3:1 Kirkwood Gap with a period of 4.04 years and an eccentricity of 0.057. It was discovered by German astronomer J. Helffrich on 18 May 1911 from the Heidelberg Observatory and was named after an order of owls. The asteroid has a mean radius of 20 km and is spinning with a rotation period of seven hours. Its pole of rotation lies just 4–14° away from the plane of the ecliptic. The surface spectrum shows a pyroxene chemistry and is consistent with mesosiderites/HED meteorites.

References

External links 
 
 

Maria asteroids
Ulula
Ulula
S-type asteroids (Tholen)
19110518